Alain Dubuc is a journalist and an economist from Montreal, Quebec, Canada. He is a columnist for Montreal's La Presse, Quebec City's Le Soleil and five other dailies in Quebec. He is a notable advocate of centre-right fiscal politics and federalism in Quebec.

Biography 
Alain Dubuc is the son of journalist Carl Dubuc. He earned a French baccalaureat at Collège Stanislas, an elite Roman Catholic private school. He went on to earn a master's degree in economics at the Université de Montréal. From 1973 to 1976, he was researcher in econometrics for the Université de Montréal. In 1976, he became a La Presse columnist specialized in economics. From 1985 to 1988, he also hosted the weekly television show Questions d'argent on Radio-Québec (now Télé-Québec) on economics and personal finances. Dubuc was appointed chief editorialist of La Presse in 1988, a position he held until 2001, when he was succeeded by André Pratte. In 2001, he was appointed president and editor of Le Soleil, a position he held until 2004. He has published in Time magazine regarding the sovereigntist Parti Québécois.

Works 
As Simple as Economics (1987)
A Dialogue on Democracy in Canada (2002, with John Ralston Saul)
Éloge de la richesse (2006)

Awards
National Business Award for Editorials from the Toronto Press Club and the Royal Bank of Canada (1982)
Award for articles on energy from the Canadian Petroleum Association and the Calgary Press Club (1983)
Journalism Award from the Quebec Foundation for Economic Education (1983)
Great Montrealer of the Future in the Field of Journalism (1984)
Annual Award for Economic Education from the Quebec Employers Council (1985)
National Newspaper Award for editorial commentary (1999, 2000, and finalist in 2001)
In 2011, he was made an Officer of the Order of Canada "for his contributions as a journalist, columnist and author covering economic and political issues in Canada".

References 
Alain Dubuc biography from the Government of Canada
Alain Dubuc biography from La Mémoire du Québec

See also 
Politics of Quebec

Living people
Academics from Montreal
Canadian economists
Journalists from Montreal
Université de Montréal alumni
Officers of the Order of Canada
Year of birth missing (living people)